Justin Dumais (born August 13, 1978, in Oxnard, California) is a former Olympic diver and current commercial airline pilot. He represented the United States in the 2004 Summer Olympics and placed 6th in the 3-meter synchronized spring board with his brother Troy Dumais.

Dumais was raised in a family of divers and swimmers, and in 1994 was named Southern Pacific Association Diver of the Year in his class, as were all his siblings.

He retired from diving after the 2004 Olympics and joined the US Air Force.  Dumais became a fighter pilot, flying F-16 aircraft in the Air National Guard, and is now a first officer at American Airlines.

In the 2011 US National Championships, he and his younger brother Dwight Dumais  participated in the men's 3-meter synchronized diving event. They finished third with 378.63 points, behind top finishers brother Troy Dumais and Kristian Ipsen.

See also 

 List of divers
 List of people from California

References 

1978 births
Living people
American male divers
Olympic divers of the United States
Divers at the 2004 Summer Olympics
Pan American Games medalists in diving
Pan American Games bronze medalists for the United States
Divers at the 2003 Pan American Games
Sportspeople from Oxnard, California
Sportspeople from Ventura County, California
United States Air Force officers
Medalists at the 2003 Pan American Games
Military personnel from California